Edward Anthony "Eddie" Grant (1 October 1928 – 30 June 1979) was a Scottish professional footballer who played as an inside forward.

References

External links

1928 births
1979 deaths
Footballers from Greenock
Scottish footballers
Association football inside forwards
Hibernian F.C. players
Weymouth F.C. players
Sheffield United F.C. players
Kilmarnock F.C. players
Grimsby Town F.C. players
Corby Town F.C. players
English Football League players
Scottish Football League players